Note that there exists a category for proteins that is more complete than this list.

A list of proteins (and protein complexes). This list aims to organize information on the protein universe.

All proteins can be found in the human proteome unless marked with a "%".

If a protein has an EC number, it should be on List of enzymes and not on this page, even if it fits into one of the categories below.

For more information about categorizing protein types, see List of types of proteins.

Fibrous protein

Cytoskeletal proteins 
	
Actin
Arp2/3
Coronin
Dystrophin
Formin
FtsZ 
Gloverin
Keratin
Myosin
Tubulin

Extracellular matrix proteins

Collagen
Elastin
F-spondin
Pikachurin
Fibronectin

Globular proteins

Plasma proteins
 Serum Amyloid P Component
 Serum albumin

Coagulation factors

Complement proteins
C1-inhibitor
C3-convertase
Factor VIII
Factor XIII
Protein C
Protein S
Protein Z
Protein Z-related protease inhibitor
Thrombin
Von Willebrand Factor

Acute phase proteins
C-reactive protein

Hemoproteins 
Hemoglobin (oxyhemoglobin and deoxyhemoglobin)

Cell adhesion
Cadherin
Ependymin
Integrin
NCAM
Selectin

Transmembrane transport proteins
Ion pumping enzymes are in the enzymes section.
CFTR
Glycophorin D
Scramblase

Ion channels
Ligand-gated ion channels
Nicotinic acetylcholine receptor
GABAa receptors
Voltage-gated ion channels
Potassium channels
Calcium channels
Sodium channels

Synport / Antiport proteins
Glucose transporter

Hormones and growth factors
Growth factors
Colony-stimulating factors (CSFs)
Epidermal growth factor (EGF)
Fibroblast growth factor (FGF)
Platelet-derived growth factor (PDGF)
Transforming growth factors (TGFs)
Vascular endothelial growth factor (VEGF)
Peptide hormones
Insulin
Insulin-like growth factor (IGF)
Oxytocin

Receptors
 Receptors with enzyme activity are in the enzymes section.
 Receptors that are ion channels are in the ion channel section.

Transmembrane receptors
G-protein-coupled receptor
Rhodopsin

Intracellular receptors
Estrogen receptor

DNA-binding protein
Histones
Protamines

Transcription & Regulation
CI protein %
Transcription regulatory proteins that are receptors are in the receptors section.
C-myc
FOXP2
FOXP3
MyoD
P53

RNA-binding protein
SRRT

Immune system proteins
Immunoglobins
Major histocompatibility antigens
T cell receptor

Nutrient storage/transport
Ferritin

Chaperone proteins
GroEL %

Enzymes
See List of enzymes

Complexes with multiple components including proteins
Nucleosome
Ribonucleoprotein (generic)
Signal recognition particle
Spliceosome

See also
Biology
Enzymes
Genes
Proteins
Index of protein-related articles
List of enzymes
NPW
PEGylation
Protein design     Enzymes
Protein family
Structural domain

 
Protein
Protein classification